Thalmus Rasulala (born Jack Crowder; November 15, 1935October 9, 1991) was an American actor with a long career in theater, television, and films. Noted for starring roles in blaxploitation films, he was also an original cast member of ABC's soap opera One Life to Live from its premiere in 1968 until he left the show in 1970.

Life and career
Born Jack Crowder in Miami, Florida, and a graduate of the University of Redlands, he appeared in many films and made guest appearances on television shows. He also attended some classes at Shaw University, a historically black university in Raleigh, North Carolina in the late 1970s. Notable blaxploitation film roles include Sidney Lord Jones in Cool Breeze (1972), Dr. Gordon Thomas in Blacula (1972) and Robert Daniels in Willie Dynamite (1974); he also was the assistant director of The Slams (1973). On television, he was known as Skeeter Matthews on Sanford and Son, Ned in The Autobiography of Miss Jane Pittman, Lt. Jack Neal on One Life to Live, Bill Thomas (Raj and Dee's father) on What's Happening!!, and Omoro Kinte (Kunta Kinte's father) in Roots. He also appeared on the first-season episode of Saturday Night Live hosted by Richard Pryor as a priest in the "Exorcist II" sketch.

On the Broadway stage, under his original name Jack Crowder, Rasulala appeared as Cornelius Hackl in the hit musical Hello, Dolly!. He was a leading member of the all-black cast that starred Pearl Bailey and Cab Calloway. The Bailey company opened on Broadway on November 12, 1967, and was recorded by RCA Victor for a best-selling cast album in which Rasulala is featured in several songs.

He also appeared on Perry Mason, Mannix, The Twilight Zone, All in the Family, The Jeffersons, Good Times, Star Trek: The Next Generation, and The Sophisticated Gents. His other film roles include Cornbread, Earl and Me (1975), Mr. Ricco (1975), Bucktown (1975), The Last Hard Men (1976), For Us the Living: The Medgar Evers Story (1983), The Boss' Wife (1986), and New Jack City (1991).

Rasulala died of leukemia on October 9, 1991, in Albuquerque, New Mexico. His last film role was as General Afir in Mom and Dad Save the World. He died shortly after completing his scenes, and the film, released a year after his death, is dedicated to his memory. Rasulala's death was two days before actor Redd Foxx, who died of a heart attack and with whom he guest-starred on Sanford & Son. In the episode, he solicited funds for heart attack prevention and awareness.

However, Judgement, also known as Hitz, can also be considered Rasulala's last film in his career as it was also released posthumously but made during his lifetime.

Partial filmography
The Out-of-Towners (1970) - Police Officer
Cool Breeze (1972) - Sidney Lord Jones
Blacula (1972) - Dr. Gordon Thomas
Willie Dynamite (1974) - Robert Daniels
Mr. Ricco (1975) - Frankie Steele
Cornbread, Earl and Me (1975) - Charlie
Bucktown (1975) - Roy
Friday Foster (1975) - Blake Tarr
Adiós Amigo (1976) - Noah
The Last Hard Men (1976) - Weed
Roots (1977) - Omoro Kinte, father of Kunta Kinte
Fun with Dick and Jane (1977) - Food Stamp Man (social worker)
The Incredible Hulk (1978) - Deputy Chief Harry Simon
Born American (1986) - The Admiral
The Boss' Wife (1986) - Barney
Bulletproof (1988) - Billy Dunbar
Above the Law (1988) - Deputy Superintendent Crowder
Star Trek: The Next Generation (1989), episode "Contagion" - Captain Donald Varley
The Package (1989) - Secret Service Commander
Lambada (1990) - Wesley Wilson
New Jack City (1991) - Police Commissioner Fred Price
Life on the Edge (1992) - Truman Brown
Mom and Dad Save the World (1992) - General Afir
Judgement (1992) - Judge Jackson (completed in 1988)

References

External links

1935 births
1991 deaths
American male film actors
Male actors from Mississippi
University of Redlands alumni
African-American male actors
American male soap opera actors
American male television actors
20th-century American male actors
20th-century African-American people